Pablo Adrián Castro Duret (born 18 January 1985) is a Uruguayan football player.

Castro played his only match for Uruguay on 7 February 2007, a friendly match 3-1 won Colombia.

In summer 2007, he left for Académica of Portuguese Liga, but did not play any official match.

External links

Profile at Tenfiel Digital 
Profile at Portuguese Liga (2007-08) 

1985 births
Living people
Footballers from Montevideo
Uruguayan footballers
Uruguayan expatriate footballers
Uruguay international footballers
C.A. Bella Vista players
Associação Académica de Coimbra – O.A.F. players
Montevideo City Torque players
Expatriate footballers in Portugal
Uruguayan expatriate sportspeople in Portugal
Association football midfielders